KLYN-LP (95.7 FM) is a radio station broadcasting a Religious radio format. Licensed to Las Vegas, New Mexico, United States. The station is currently owned by The Rock Christian Outreach. Prior to this, the KLYN callsign belonged to Crista Ministries' Praise 106.5 in Lynden, Washington.  That station eventually adopted the callsign of KWPZ.

References

External links
 

LYN-LP
Las Vegas, New Mexico